Cureton may refer to:

 Sir Charles Cureton (British Indian Army officer) KCB (1826–1891), British general 
 William Cureton (1808–1864), English Orientalist
 Jamie Cureton (born 1975), English footballer
 Earl Cureton (born 1957), American basketball player
 Cureton family, originating from the first Lords of Curton